Rayado may refer to:

 Rayado, New Mexico, a settlement in Colfax County, New Mexico, USA
 Rayado Program, a leadership program at Philmont Scout Ranch, New Mexico, USA
 Rayado Mesa, a mesa (landform) in Colfax County, New Mexico, USA
 Rayado Peak, a mountain near Rayado, Colfax County, New Mexico, USA
 Rayado Creek, also Rio Rayado, a tributary of the Cimarron River
 Rayado River Camp, a camp at Philmont Scout Ranch, New Mexico, USA
 Rayado Indians, a Spanish term for the Wichita people